Hekking is a surname.

People of that name include:

André Hekking (1866-1925), French cellist
Anton Hekking (1856-1935), Dutch cellist
Brock Hekking (born 1991), American football player
Frank Hekking (1964-2017), Dutch physicist
Gérard Hekking (1879-1942), French cellist
Henri Hekking (1902/02-1994), Dutch physician

Surnames